Samara is the administrative center of Samara Oblast and currently the city is divided into 9 city-districts.

As part of Samara Oblast Administration, the city of Samara is the city of regional significance.

Samara has 9 districts since its administrative reform in 1978

List of districts

See also 

 Samara

References

External links 

 Districts of Samara

Samara, Russia